Academia del Perpetuo Socorro (English: "Academy of Our Lady of Perpetual Help") was founded in 1921 as a Catholic parochial school of the Perpetuo Socorro Parish at the Archdiocese of San Juan, Puerto Rico. The school is located in Miramar in Puerto Rico's capital city of San Juan. Students, teachers and alumni commonly refer to their school as Perpetuo.

Mission
The goal of the  Academia del Perpetuo Socorro is the complete development of the student - spiritually, mentally, morally, socially, culturally, and physically in order to live a full life and to prepare for his/her final goal - union with God. To this end, the school works to create a Catholic academic community in which faith, knowledge, and recreation are shared in a spirit of freedom, love, and creativity. The school, however, does not emphasize religion over other subjects, accepts students of all faiths and does not impose religious requirements such as baptism, confirmation or church attendance as a condition for continued attendance.

Motto
"Esto Perpetua" translated as "This Endures" stressing how the Catholic values and formal academic education learned at this school, symbolized in the school seal by the oil lamp over the open book, (as in burning the midnight oil) are to permeate individuals and society forever.

Clubs

Sports teams
Academia del Perpetuo Socorro has the largest gymnasium in the Caribbean. This gymnasium has three wooden volleyball courts that can also be transformed into two basketball courts. The gymnasium also has a small gym where athletes, faculty members, and students can go to do exercise.

Perpetuo has a varsity program in ten sports:

In popular media
The school is featured prominently in Magali García Ramis's novel Felices Días, Tío Sergio. The school was the main film location for the movie Casi casi (2006) and forms the basis for the fictional school featured in the film.

Notable alumni
 Roy Brown, singer/songwriter
 Dr. Fernando Cabanillas Escalona - Oncologist and medical researcher. 
 Marisol Calero, actress and singer
 Salvador E. Casellas, United States district judge of the United States District Court for the District of Puerto Rico.
 Henry Darrow, actor
 Harold Ignacio Peón Castro, a winner of the U.S. presidential scholar award in May, 2020
 Michael Collins, test pilot and astronaut, Apollo 11 astronaut
 Cristina Córdova, sculptor
 Josie de Guzman, actress and singer
 Lawrence La Fountain-Stokes, scholar
 Magali García Ramis, writer
 Gustavo Gelpí, Federal Appellate Judge, 1st U.S. Circuit Court of Appeals
 Marian Pabón, actress
 Ana María Polo, lawyer/arbitrator
 Johanna Rosaly, actress, singer, and television host
 Gabriel Ríos, musician
 Pedro Rosselló, 7th Governor of Puerto Rico, medical doctor and politician
 Xavier Romeu, attorney and politician
 Benicio del Toro, Academy Award and Golden Globe Award winning actor
 Camille L. Vélez-Rivé, U.S. Magistrate Judge, United States district judge of the United States District Court for the District of Puerto Rico.
 Yalí-Marie Williams, soprano singer
 Myraida Chaves, actress

References

Buildings and structures in San Juan, Puerto Rico
Education in San Juan, Puerto Rico
Miramar (Santurce)
Catholic secondary schools in Puerto Rico